Kunjah (Punjabi and ) is a city in Gujrat District of Punjab, Pakistan.

History 
Various accounts date the founding of Kunjah anywhere from the 4th century BCE during the time of Alexander the Great to the 8th century CE. Kunjah is named after a raja named Kunjpal who is also often credited to be the founder of the town. Islam was brought to the region by the Umayyad Caliphate early in the 8th century and soon replaced Buddhism as the dominant religion. Kunjah grew in prominence in the 9th and 10th centuries.

Starting during the Muslim period, Kunjah was considered a strategically important town. Ibrahim Bin Masood used Kunjah as his main base for his attack on neighboring districts. In the Mughal period, King Aurangzeb Alamgir also visited Kunjah, and during his stay in Kunjah he built a mosque that is now named after him.

Kunjah prospered during the time of the Sikh Empire. In that period the town was home to a number of gardens, two royal palaces and a royal bathing pool connected by tunnels, and a baradari that still stands today.

Demographics 

According to 1998 Population and Housing Census, population was estimated to be 30,000 but now it is estimated to be 35,000, with about 4500 households. The main religion is Sunni Islam, with a small Shi'a and Ahmadiyya minority and a few Christians. There are about 50 mosques, one imam bargah  and one church and one temple. Many residents live abroad, mainly in the UK, Italy, Spain and Greece.

Politics and government 
Kunjah lies in the NA-69 (Gujrat-II) (previously NA 105) of Punjab for the national assembly elections and PP-30 (Gujrat-III) (previously PP 110) for the provincial assembly of Punjab. In the 2018 elections Moonis Elahi has been elected from NA 69 seat and Chaudhry Pervaiz Elahi has been elected a member of the Punjab Assembly from PP 30 seat.  From 2013 to 2018 Chaudhry Pervaiz Elahi and Moonis Elahi have been members of the National Assembly and Provincial Assembly respectively.  

Aside from the local government and a regional police station, a police post in the centre of the city the national government is represented by a military signals station and a WAPDA subdivision.

Tribes and Clans 

Major tribes in Kunjah include Jatt, Rajput, Gujjar, Meer, Dar, Butt, Sheikh, Arain the desandants of Arabs who entered in Indian Sub continent with Muhammad Bin Qasim and settled here since the time of Umayyad, Abbassi, Syed, Mughals and Sheikh. The cityconsists of historic forts and pools "Talab" from the Mughal rule and then from Sikh rule. These forts and "Shahi Talabs" were granted to prominent Arain clan of Kunjah due to their great contribution in the Mughal and Sikh period.

Education 
The government operates seven schools: two primary schools for boys, two high schools for girls and one for boys, a boys higher secondary school and a girls degree college.

Economy 
Most economic activity revolves around agriculture. The primary crops are wheat, rice, tobacco and vegetables. Farms are supplied with irrigation from the Upper Jehlum Canal, and tobacco production is supported by two tobacco factories and a research substation. The main bazaar is a regional trade centre consisting of 500 shops.

Culture 

People of Kunjah believed that The famous Sohni among the Sohni Mahiwal folklore came from Kunjah but the intellectual Dr. Qureshi Ahmad Hussain Qiladari had other ideas and he contradicted from this myth.
For now Kunjah has a modest type of culture i.e. it is semi-urban type. Both men and women wear shalwar qameez.

Fairs and festivals 
An annual fair is held in Kunjah on 4 August. It is held at the shrine of a cleric Shah Shujah Bukhari so it is also known to be an urs. Other festivals are also held but they are losing their touch nowadays due to the busy lives of the modern days and children getting more interested in the TV films and Computer Games rather than the oldies.

Sports 

Cricket like all the other parts of the country is the game of choice for majority. Along with cricket, indoor games like snooker and billiard are also played. Some other games like chess, badminton and football are also played seasonally. Volleyball is being played in adjacent Villages.

Transport 
Only road transport is available. There is no railway station. The transport is available only in form of wagons and buses. Along with these the cars are available as taxis. The transport is available for Gujrat city and to other small towns surrounding Kunjah.

Notable people from Kunjah 
 Baisakhi Mal, tradesman and father to Dewan Mokham Chand a member of Maharaja Ranjit Singh's Generals and commander-in-chief in the [[Battle of Attock
 Major Shabbir Sharif Shaheed, holder of the Nishan-e-Haider, Pakistan's highest military award for bravery.
 Ex-General Raheel Sharif, brother of Major Shabir Sharif, and ex-Army Chief of Staff of Pakistan.
 Shareef Kunjahi, (1915–2007) was one of the leading writers and poets of Punjabi language. He was among the first faculty members of the Department of Punjabi Language, University of Punjab in the 1970s and contributed to Punjabi literature as a poet, prose writer, teacher, research scholar, linguist

References 

Populated places in Gujrat District
Gujrat District